Saint-Genest-sur-Roselle is a commune in the Haute-Vienne department in the Nouvelle-Aquitaine region in west-central France.

Geography
The Roselle, a tributary of the Briance, forms most of the commune's northern border; the Briance forms all of its southern border.

See also
Communes of the Haute-Vienne department

References

Communes of Haute-Vienne